George Fraser (1881 – 21 October 1951) was a Scottish footballer who made 265 appearances in the Football League for Lincoln City. He played at right half. He played for his local club, Elgin City, before moving to England to join Sunderland in 1889, but never represented them in senior competition, and signed for Second Division club Lincoln City in 1901. He spent ten years with Lincoln, making 330 appearances in all competitions, and contributed to their Midland League title in 1908–09.

Fraser managed Lincoln City from 1919 to 1921, and took charge of Grimsby Town from 1921 to 1924, a post he resigned because he felt the club's directors were interfering in his team selections.

Notes

References

1881 births
1951 deaths
People from Elgin, Moray
Scottish footballers
Association football wing halves
Elgin City F.C. players
Sunderland A.F.C. players
Lincoln City F.C. players
English Football League players
Scottish football managers
Lincoln City F.C. managers
Grimsby Town F.C. managers
Date of birth missing
Place of death missing
Sportspeople from Moray